is a junior college in Tokyo, Japan.

The institute was founded in 1968 as a professional school, and became a junior college in 2005.

External links
  

Educational institutions established in 1968
Japanese junior colleges
Universities and colleges in Tokyo